Valentina Salapura from AMD Research was named Fellow of the Institute of Electrical and Electronics Engineers (IEEE) in 2012 for contributions to the architecture and design of multiprocessor systems.

References 

Fellow Members of the IEEE
Living people
Year of birth missing (living people)
Place of birth missing (living people)
American electrical engineers